Cyrtodactylus ziegleri is a species of gecko, a lizard in the family Gekkonidae. The species is endemic to Vietnam.

Etymology
The specific name, ziegleri, is in honor of German herpetologist Thomas Ziegler.

Geographic range
C. ziegleri is found in southern Vietnam, in Dak Lak Province.

Habitat

Description

Reproduction
The mode of reproduction of C. ziegleri is unknown.

References

Further reading
Nazarov RA, Orlov N, Nguyen NS, Ho TC (2008). "Taxonomy of Naked-Toes Geckos Cyrtodactylus irregularis Complex of South Vietnam and Description of a New Species from Chu Yang Sin Natural Park (Krong Bong District, Dac Lac Province, Vietnam)". Russian Journal of Herpetology 15 (2): 141–156. (Cyrtodactylus ziegleri, new species).

Cyrtodactylus
Reptiles described in 2008